The Gate Theatre may refer to:

Gate Theatre, a theatre in Dublin
Gate Theatre (New York City), a former theatre in New York City
Gate Theatre Studio, a former theatre in London
Gate Theatre (London), a current theatre in London